Qajar-e Takht Rostam (also known as Qajar, Deh-e Qajar, Qajar-e Khāleşeh, and Qājārīyeh) is a village in Juqin Rural District, in the Central District of Shahriar County, Tehran Province, Iran. At the 2006 census, its population was 390, in 86 families.

References 

Populated places in Shahriar County